This is a list of knitting stitches. Common knitting abbreviations as used in patterns are shown in parentheses.

Individual stitches

 Knit stitch (k)
 Purl stitch (p)

Variations
 Elongated stitch
 Plaited stitch, also known as a twisted stitch (k tbl, p tbl)
 Slip stitch, may be knit or purl stitch (sl, sl st)

Increases

 Yarn over (yo)
 Dip stitch which can be either 
 A raised increase, knitting into row below (k-b, k 1 b)
 A lifted increase, knitting into the yarn between the stitches (inc, m1)
 Knit front and back (kfb)
 Purl front and back (pass slipped stitch over (S1, K1, PSSO) for a left-leaning decrease.
 Knit two together through the back loops (K2tog tbl) for a left-leaning decrease.

Stitch patterns

Knit and purl
Basic
 Garter stitch
 Stockinette stitch, also known as stocking stitch
 Reverse stockinette stitch

Variations
 Basket stitch
 Seed stitch, also known as moss stitch
 Waffle stitch

Rib

 English rib (or mistake rib or uneven rib)
 Farrow rib
Fisherman's Rib stitch

Eyelet and lace
 Faggoting
 Raspberry stitch

Cable and twist
 Cable stitch

Slipped stitch patterns
 Crossed stitch
 Herringbone stitch
 Linen stitch is a pattern that creates a tightly knit fabric that resembles woven linen. Tailored garments are especially suited for the linen stitch. It is a durable stitch, and is often used to reinforce the heels of hand-knitted socks. It includes knit and purl stitches, as well as slipped stitches.
 Loop stitch

Other
 Bobble
 Tricot knitting

Gallery

See also
Basic knitted fabrics
Binding off
Casting on
Knitting
Knitting abbreviations

References
 
Vogue Knitting Magazine (2012) Vogue Knitting Stitchionary Volume 1: Knit and Purl, Sixth&Spring Books.  
Walker, Barbara G (1998) A Treasury of Knitting Patterns, Schoolhouse Press.

External links
 Collection of Knitting Stitches at eKnitting Stitches
 List of knitting stitches
 Different types and classification of stitches
 Knitting Video Stictionary at New Stitch a Day
 Craft Cookie list of Knitting Stitches
 List of Knitting Stitch Patterns at Knitting on the Net
 Knitting Fool Stitch List including more than 2,400 stitch patterns, arranged alphabetically
 Knitting Bee Knitting Stitch Library

 
Articles containing video clips